30 Years Ago (translit. Men Thalatawn Sana) is a 2016 Egyptian drama film directed by Amr Arafa.

Cast 
 Ahmed El Sakka - Emad
 Mona Zaki - Hanan
 Sherif Mounir - Omar
 Mervat Amin - Nagwa
 Nour - Rasha

References

External links 

Egyptian drama films
2016 drama films
2010s Arabic-language films
21st-century Egyptian films